Jack Edward Nichols (April 9, 1926 – December 24, 1992) was an American professional basketball player.

A 6'7" power forward who attended the University of Washington and the University of Southern California, Nichols played nine seasons (1948–1951;1952–1958) in the National Basketball Association as a member of the Washington Capitols, Tri-Cities Blackhawks, Milwaukee Hawks, and Boston Celtics.  He scored 5,245 points in his career and was a contributor to the Celtics' 1957 NBA championship team, who was coached by his former Washington Capitol coach, Red Auerbach.  During his last 3 years with the Celtics, he attended Tufts Dental School full-time, earning his doctor of dentistry in 1958.

During his collegiate career, Nichols was named an all-conference player in five different seasons, twice with USC, and three times at UW (only player ever to achieve this). In 1948 he set the single game (39 points vs. Idaho) and single season scoring records for the Pacific Coast Conference.  He was named a Helms Foundation All-American, and led the Huskies to the 1948 NCAA tournament by Beating Cal in a 3-game series.

Upon his retirement from professional basketball, Nichols served as the team dentist for the University of Washington and for the Seattle SuperSonics. Nichols has been inducted into the University of Washington Hall of Fame, the State of Washington Sports Hall of Fame, and the Pac-12 Conference Hall of Honor.

BAA/NBA career statistics

Regular season

Playoffs

External links

Career statistics

1926 births
1992 deaths
All-American college men's basketball players
American dentists
American men's basketball players
Boston Celtics players
Centers (basketball)
Milwaukee Hawks players
Power forwards (basketball)
Tri-Cities Blackhawks players
USC Trojans men's basketball players
Washington Capitols draft picks
Washington Capitols players
Washington Huskies men's basketball players
20th-century dentists
Tufts University School of Dental Medicine alumni